KSHS may refer to:

 Kansas State Historical Society

 Kentucky Historical Society
 Kaohsiung Municipal High School
 King Solomon High School
 Kingdom of Serbs, Croats and Slovenes
 Kesteven and Sleaford High School